Kraichtal is a town in the north-eastern part of the Karlsruhe district in Baden-Württemberg, Germany. It was founded in 1971 by a merger of nine smaller municipalities.

Geography
Kraichtal is a town embedded in western Kraichgau, a hilly landscape between the Black Forest, Odenwald forest and the Neckar river. Kraichtal (literally Kraich Valley) got its name from the Kraich river, which flows through Kraichtal, and then eventually into the Rhine.

Neighbouring towns
The following towns neighbour Kraichtal: Eppingen and Zaisenhausen, Oberderdingen, Bretten, Bruchsal, Ubstadt-Weiher and Oestringen.

Districts
Kraichtal consists of nine districts, each district (Stadtteil) representing one of the nine municipalities which merged to become Kraichtal in 1971:

Bahnbrücken
Gochsheim (Baden)
Landshausen
Menzingen (Baden)
Münzesheim
Neuenbürg (Baden)
Oberöwisheim
Oberacker
Unteröwisheim

Count Eberstein Castle lies in Gochsheim, in the north east of Kraichtal.

References 

Karlsruhe (district)